Little Dip Conservation Park is a protected area in the Australian state of South Australia located in the Limestone Coast about  north-west of Mount Gambier and about  south of the town of Robe. It was proclaimed as a conservation park under the National Parks and Wildlife Act 1972 in 1975 for the purpose of conserving 'remnant vegetation and a chain of small lakes which combine to provide habitat for several endangered and vulnerable bird species' and managing 'the increasing use' of the locality 'for recreation purposes'. The conservation park is classified as an IUCN Category VI protected area.

See also
 Lake Hawdon System Important Bird Area

References

External links
Little Little Dip Conservation Park official webpage
Little Dip Conservation Park webpage on protected planet

Conservation parks of South Australia
Protected areas established in 1975
1975 establishments in Australia